Radioropa Info was the name of various German-language privately owned  longwave radio stations.  They were mainly active in the 1990s, with break in the middle of the decade.

Radioropa was initially only available on satellite.  It then began using time on the Radio Wolga longwave service on 261 kHz at the Burg AM transmitter in Burg bei Magdeburg, Saxony-Anhalt.  Radioropa then obtained FM frequencies in Rhineland-Palatinate and Saxony.  When the Soviet army withdrew from the former East Germany in 1994, Radioropa took over 261 kHz completely.  Longwave transmission stopped during 1994/1995 because the cost of renting transmission time was too high.  After a new contract with Deutsche Telekom was negotiated,  Radioropa resumed broadcasting on longwave.

Radioropa Info broadcast news. Later it mainly rebroadcast programmes supplied by other stations.  Since listenership on longwave and satellite radio was too low, Radioropa Info applied for FM frequencies at the end of the 1990s.  FM licenses were not granted and Radioropa Info  went out of business on 31 December 2000.

External links
 Burg, früher 261 kHz  — brief history of transmissions on 261 kHz in Germany

Radio stations disestablished in 2008
Defunct radio stations in Germany
German-language radio stations
Radio stations established in 1990
News and talk radio stations
Saxony-Anhalt